Charlemont may refer to:

Places 
Charlemont, County Armagh, a village in Northern Ireland
Charlemont (Parliament of Ireland constituency), a former constituency
Charlemont, Massachusetts, a town in the United States
Charlemont, Victoria, a suburb of Geelong in Australia
Charlemont and Grove Vale, a political ward in Sandwell, England
Fortress of Charlemont, a fortification along the Belgian border in Givet, France

People 
George Charlemont (1873–1907), Irish Gaelic footballer
Joseph Charlemont (1839–1918), French savate and canne de combat teacher
Viscount Charlemont and other titles in the peerage of Ireland